Dino Morea (born 9 December 1975) is an Indian actor and model who appears in Hindi films.

Early life
Dino Morea was born in Bangalore to an Italian father and an Indian mother. His mother hails from Kalamassery in Kochi. He is the second of three brothers, Nicolo Morea is his older brother and Santino Morea his younger brother. He initially attended Bangalore Military School, graduated from St. Joseph's College in Bangalore and also went to Clarence High School. He was first noticed while modelling for a fashion company and soon received his first film offer.

Career
Morea made his acting debut in the TV series Captain Vyom in which he appeared as "Sonic". His movie debut was in Pyaar Mein Kabhi Kabhi opposite Rinke Khanna. He had breakthrough roles in Rajiv Menon's Tamil film Kandukondain Kandukondain, the 2002 horror film Raaz and the thriller Gunaah. His other prominent films include Baaz: A Bird in Danger, Sssshhh..., Rakht and Acid Factory. He was a contestant on the reality show Khatron Ke Khiladi in 2010.

In 1998, an ad for the undergarment manufacturer Calida, featuring him and Bipasha Basu, caused controversy because it featured him biting the former's underwear. It was eventually taken down.

Awards and nominations

Filmography

As a producer
 Jism 2 (2012)
 Helmet (2021)

References

External links

 
 
 InsideDesi Interview with Dino Morea 

1975 births
Male actors from Bangalore
Indian male film actors
Indian male models
Indian people of Italian descent
Living people
Male actors in Hindi cinema
Indian male voice actors
21st-century Indian male actors
Male actors in Malayalam cinema
Male actors in Kannada cinema
Male actors in Tamil cinema
Fear Factor: Khatron Ke Khiladi participants